Rolf Siljan Andreassen (born 3 April 1949) is a Norwegian competition rower and Olympic medalist.

He received a silver medal in the coxless four event at the 1976 Summer Olympics in Montreal, together with Finn Tveter, Ole Nafstad, and Arne Bergodd.

References

1949 births
Living people
Norwegian male rowers
Olympic rowers of Norway
Olympic silver medalists for Norway
Rowers at the 1972 Summer Olympics
Rowers at the 1976 Summer Olympics
Olympic medalists in rowing
Medalists at the 1976 Summer Olympics
European Rowing Championships medalists
Sportspeople from Drammen